Brown of Harvard, also known as Tom Brown at Harvard, is a 1918 film based on the 1906 Broadway play Brown of Harvard  by Rida Johnson Young and the novel by Young and Gilbert Colman. The Washington State University football team and its coach, William "Lone Star" Dietz, participated in filming while in Southern California for the 1916 Rose Bowl.

Plot
As described in a film magazine, Tom Brown (Moore), a student at Harvard University, is engaged to Evelyn Ames (Daly). Her brother has become desperately involved with Marian Thorne (Winston). In an effort to protect his fiance's brother, the stigma associated with Marian Thorne's condition rests upon Tom. Evelyn breaks her engagement. Wilton Ames (Greene) crowns his borrowing of money from Tom by stealing a blank check and forging it for $300 to get Marion out of the city so that her condition may not get known. Gerald Thorne (McGrail), brother of Marian and stoke on the Harvard crew, refuses to enter the race after he is given a spurious note from his sister saying that she is leaving the city and wants to see him. Brown is put in his place and the race is won. Following the race, Gerald confronts him and charges him with being responsible for his sister's downfall. Evelyn demands that Tom marry Marian when Wilton finally confesses that he is the man involved. With Brown shown in his true light a happy reconciliation follows.

Cast
Tom Moore as Tom Brown
Hazel Daly as Evelyn Ames
Sidney Ainsworth as Victor Colton (credited as Sydney Ainsworth)
Warner Richmond as Claxton Madden
Walter McGrail as Gerald Thorne
Nancy Winston as Marian Thorne
Alice Gordon as Mrs. Ames
Kempton Greene as Wilton Ames
Francis Joyner as Cart Wright (credited as Frank Joyner)
Frank Joyner as Cart Wright
Robert Ellis as 'Bud' Hall
Lydia Dalzell as Edith Sinclair
Walter Hiers as Tubby
Arthur Housman as Happy (credited as Arthur Hausman)
Johnnie Walker as Jean
William "Lone Star" Dietz Football Player (uncredited)

References

External links

1918 films
American black-and-white films
Films based on American novels
American films based on plays
Films set in Massachusetts
American silent feature films
Harvard Crimson rowing
Films based on adaptations
Films set in Harvard University
American sports drama films
1910s sports drama films
1918 directorial debut films
1918 drama films
1910s American films
Silent American drama films
1910s English-language films
Silent sports drama films